Branimir Kalaica (born 1 June 1998) is a Croatian professional footballer who last played as a centre-back for Portuguese side Benfica B in Liga Portugal 2.

Club career
Born in Zagreb, Kalaica started his football career at local club Dinamo Zagreb. In June 2016, he moved to Portugal and signed a six-year contract with defending champions Benfica, as a free agent. On 11 September, he debuted for Benfica's reserve team in a 2–1 home win against Académico de Viseu in LigaPro.

Honours
Benfica
 Primeira Liga: 2016–17
 Supertaça Cândido de Oliveira: 2016
 UEFA Youth League runner-up: 2016–17

References

External links
 
 

1998 births
Living people
Footballers from Zagreb
Association football central defenders
Croatian footballers
Croatia youth international footballers
GNK Dinamo Zagreb players
S.L. Benfica footballers
S.L. Benfica B players
Liga Portugal 2 players
Primeira Liga players
Croatian expatriate footballers
Expatriate footballers in Portugal
Croatian expatriate sportspeople in Portugal